The Officers' Ward, is a 2001 French film, directed by François Dupeyron and starring Eric Caravaca as the central character. It was based on the novel by Marc Dugain, which in turn was based on the experiences of one of the author's own ancestors during World War I. The film received nine nominations at the 27th César Awards, winning Best Supporting Actor for André Dussollier and Best Cinematography for Tetsuo Nagata.

Plot
The film concentrates more on the period spent in hospital than the novel, and emphasizes the horror of the friends' injuries. On Adrien's arrival at the ward, all the mirrors are removed and staff are instructed not to give him one, but we see from the faces of others how bad the damage is. Adrien becomes increasingly desperate to see the damage done to his face, even asking a visitor to draw him. Dupeyron ensures that we do not see the horrifying extent of Adrien's injuries until he does - by seeing his reflection in a window.

There is a focus on the fleeting romance between Adrien and Clémence, whom he met by chance shortly before the war, and his attempts to find her. When he finally does, she fails to recognise him.

Whereas the novel follows the experiences of the group right up to World War II and beyond, the film ends just after the First World War, the final scene being Adrien's chance meeting with his future wife.

Cast
 Eric Caravaca : Adrien
 Denis Podalydès : Henri
 Grégori Derangère : Pierre
 Sabine Azéma : Anaïs
 André Dussollier : The surgeon
 Isabelle Renauld : Marguerite
 Géraldine Pailhas : Clémence
 Jean-Michel Portal : Alain
 Xavier De Guillebon : Louis
 Elise Tielrooy : Nurse Cécile
 Catherine Arditi : Adrien's mother
 Paul Le Person : Adrien's grandfather

Awards and nominations
Cannes Film Festival (France)
Nominated: Golden Palm (François Dupeyron)
César Awards (France)
Won: Best Cinematography (Tetsuo Nagata)
Won: Best Actor – Supporting Role (André Dussollier)
Nominated: Best Actor – Leading Role (Eric Caravaca)
Nominated: Best Costume Design (Catherine Bouchard)
Nominated: Best Director (François Dupeyron)
Nominated: Best Film
Nominated: Best Writing (François Dupeyron)
Nominated: Most Promising Actor (Grégori Derangère and Jean-Michel Portal)

References

External links

2001 films
2001 drama films
French drama films
2000s French-language films
Films directed by François Dupeyron
Films featuring a Best Supporting Actor César Award-winning performance
Films set on the French home front during World War I
2000s French films